The Institute of Quarrying is the international professional body for quarrying, construction materials and the related extractive and processing industries. The Institute's long-term objective is to promote progressive improvements in all aspects of operational performance of the extractives industry through education and training. The Institute has been supporting the extractives industry and associated sectors since 1917.

History
The Institute was founded on 19 October 1917 from a meeting of “The Association of Quarry Managers” in Caernarfon in North Wales. Anne Greaves was the first woman to become a member of the Institute of Quarrying in 1925. Gradually expanding over the years, IQ now has affiliate organisations in Australia, New Zealand, Malaysia, Southern Africa and Hong Kong.

In September 2012 the Institute moved to its new premises at McPherson House, named after its founder Simon McPherson, in Chilwell, Nottingham.

Structure
The largest membership group remains in the UK, where the Institute was founded in 1917. Australia constitutes the largest group in the Pacific region and close ties are maintained with their neighbours in New Zealand and Malaysia. To the north, members are based in Hong Kong, operating both in the territory and China. The Institute's activities in Southern Africa are centred on South Africa which provides support for members in other countries of the region.

UK
It has thirteen regional branches in the UK.

International
 The Institute of Quarrying Australia
 The Institute of Quarrying New Zealand
 The Institute of Quarrying Hong Kong
 The Institute of Quarrying Southern Africa
 The Institute of Quarrying Malaysia

Function
It regulates the quarrying industry, providing training and consultation for standards in the industry, similar to other engineering professional bodies.

Arms

See also
 Mineral Products Association

References

External links
 Institute of Quarrying
 Quarry Management - Journal
 Agg-Net - The Aggregates & Recycling Information Network

1917 establishments in the United Kingdom
Engineering organizations
Trade associations based in the United Kingdom
Organisations based in Nottingham
Organizations established in 1917
Quarrying
Quarrying in the United Kingdom